Marina Zhukova (born 15 October 1966) is a Russian rower. She competed in the women's double sculls event at the 1988 Summer Olympics.

References

1966 births
Living people
Russian female rowers
Olympic rowers of the Soviet Union
Rowers at the 1988 Summer Olympics
Sportspeople from Tver